Božidar Đurković (Serbian Cyrillic: Божидар Ђурковић; born 4 January 1972) is a retired Serbian football player.

Career
After starting in his hometown Spartak Subotica, Đurković has played for home league FK Vojvodina, Bulgarian PFC CSKA Sofia, Portuguese Vitória S.C., German Union Berlin, Russian FC Arsenal Tula and Serbian OFK Beograd, FK Smederevo, FK Javor Ivanjica and FK BASK.

References

External sources
 
 
 
 Stats until 2003 at Dekisa.Tripod

1972 births
Living people
Sportspeople from Subotica
Serbian footballers
FK Spartak Subotica players
FK Vojvodina players
PFC CSKA Sofia players
First Professional Football League (Bulgaria) players
Expatriate footballers in Bulgaria
Vitória S.C. players
Primeira Liga players
Expatriate footballers in Portugal
OFK Beograd players
1. FC Union Berlin players
Expatriate footballers in Germany
Expatriate footballers in Russia
FK Smederevo players
FK Javor Ivanjica players
FK BASK players
Association football midfielders
Serbian expatriate sportspeople in Bulgaria
FC Arsenal Tula players